The third series of Dancing with the Stars premiered on 10 April 2007, with both Gunn and Lane coming back to host. All judges were back with the exception of Paul Mercurio who wanted to focus more on the Australian version of Dancing with the Stars. In season three, it opened with 735,000 people watching, the highest out of all series' debuts. On 29 May 2007, Suzanne Paul and her partner Stefano Olivieri took the title of Dancing with the Stars.

Couples

Scorecard

Red numbers indicate the couples with the lowest score for each week.
Green numbers indicate the couples with the highest score for each week.
 indicates the couples eliminated that week.
 indicates the returning couple that finished in the bottom two.
 indicates the winning couple.
 indicates the runner-up couple.

Dance Chart

 Highest Scoring Dance
 Lowest Scoring Dance

Average chart

Week 1 
Individual judges scores in the chart below (given in parentheses) are listed in this order from left to right: Brendan, Carol-Ann, Craig, Alison.

Running order

References

series 3
2007 New Zealand television seasons